Knap is a surname, and may refer to:

 Josef Knap (1900–1973), Czech writer, poet and literary critic
 Ted Knap (1920–2023), American journalist
 Tony Knap (1914–2011), college football head coach at Utah State, Boise State, and UNLV